Nettenchelys taylori is an eel in the family Nettastomatidae (duckbill/witch eels). It was described by Alfred William Alcock in 1898. It is a marine, deep-water dwelling eel which is known from a single specimen from India, in the western Indian Ocean.

The species epithet "taylori" refers to Commander A. Dundas Taylor of the Indian Navy, credited by the author as playing a notable role in the revival of the Marine Survey of India in 1874.

References

Nettastomatidae
Fish described in 1898